Rinko Kimino is an established Japanese author about kimono, Japanese zakka (folk craft goods) and kabuki. She writes and edits books, magazines and newspapers. She is also a renowned kimono stylist and a product development planner for Japanese zakka.

Her works are geared toward the young people in Japan, and promote Japanese traditions such as kimono, tenugui towels and the kabuki theater with a modern sensibility.

After graduating from college, she was hired by an import/export company in the U.S. Eventually, she went back to Japan and became a freelance writer. She wrote for evening newspapers, magazines, etc. about raising children and all things feminine, and acted as a planner, editor and director at websites for childcare and women. She started writing for books, newspaper and magazines about kimono and "Wa"(Japanese style), in which she became interested during her stay in the U.S. Rinko moved to Los Angeles in May 2010 and continues her writing to introduce the Japanese culture to people overseas.

Rinko's published books include:
“Hand Craft Memo for Kimono (Hand-Made Kimono Crafts)” (by Shogakukan)
“A Nosey Kimono Calendar by Rinko Kimino (Rinko Kimino’s Nosey Kimono Calendar)” (by Shogakukan)
“Cute Kabuki Costume Picture Book (A Guide to Cute Kabuki Costumes)” with supervision from renowned kabuki actor Somegoro Ichikawa (by Shogakukan) 
“Kabuki’s Amazing Enjoyment Picture Book (Super Indulgent Kabuki Guide)” (by Shogakukan) 
“Heisei Kimono Picture Book” (by Kawade-Shobou Co.)
“Haikara (hi-fashion) Tenugui Towel Guide” (by Kawade-Shobou Co.)
"Kimono Convenience Guide” (by Kawade-Shobou Co.)
“Rinko Kimino’s Kimono Dress-up Book” (by Mainichi Communications)

References

External links 
 
 

Living people
Year of birth missing (living people)
Japanese non-fiction writers